Monica Nolan (December 28, 1913 in Cincinnati, Ohio – December 18, 1995) was an American tennis player in the 1930s and 1940s.

Nolan made six finals appearances at the Cincinnati Masters. She won the doubles title in 1939 with Catherine Wolf, was a three-time doubles finalist (1942, 1938 and 1937), and was a two-time singles finalist (1942 & 1937).

Nolan also won the 1939 Ohio Singles Championship and was a finalist in that tournament in 1938. At the Kentucky State Championship, she won singles titles in 1938 & 1939. She also won the Northern Kentucky tennis championship in 1931.

She played on the University of Cincinnati tennis team and is a member of the University of Cincinnati Athletic Hall of Fame.

References

1913 births
1995 deaths
American female tennis players
Cincinnati Bearcats women's tennis players
Tennis players from Cincinnati
20th-century American women